Christian Hess House and Shoemaker's Shop, also known as the Christian Hess Homestead and Weaver House, is a historic home and commercial building located at Schoharie, Schoharie County, New York.  The house was built about 1783, and is a -story, banked, timber frame dwelling in a traditional New World Dutch style.  A wing was added in 1977.  Also on the property is a small shoemaker's shop, built about 1805.  It is an "L"-shaped building with a gable roof.

It was listed on the National Register of Historic Places in 2015.

References

Houses on the National Register of Historic Places in New York (state)
Commercial buildings on the National Register of Historic Places in New York (state)
Houses completed in 1783
Commercial buildings completed in 1805
Houses in Schoharie County, New York
National Register of Historic Places in Schoharie County, New York